First Cow is a 2019 American drama film directed by Kelly Reichardt, from a screenplay by Reichardt and Jonathan Raymond based on Raymond's 2004 novel The Half-Life. It stars John Magaro, Orion Lee, Toby Jones, Ewen Bremner, Scott Shepherd, Gary Farmer, Stephen Malkmus, Alia Shawkat, and Lily Gladstone. It also features René Auberjonois in one of his final film roles.

The film had its world premiere at the Telluride Film Festival on August 30, 2019, and was selected to compete for the Golden Bear in the main competition section at the 70th Berlin International Film Festival. It was theatrically released by A24 in the United States on March 6, 2020, and released on VOD platforms on July 10, 2020, to acclaim from critics. It won Best Film at the 2020 New York Film Critics Circle Awards, and was named one of the ten best films of 2020 by the National Board of Review.

Plot

In the present, a woman walking her dog on the riverside discovers two skeletons lying together in a shallow grave.

In 1820, Otis "Cookie" Figowitz is a quiet chef traveling in Oregon Country with a group of loud and aggressive fur trappers who harass him for not finding them enough food. One night, he comes across King-Lu, a Chinese immigrant on the run for killing a Russian man. Cookie allows Lu to hide in his tent for the night and watches him escape across the river the next day.

Cookie's group reaches a fort and Lu finds him there, babysitting an infant in the middle of a bar fight, and invites him to his house. Cookie moves in, and learns Lu is thinking about starting a farm, while Cookie talks about opening a bakery or hotel in San Francisco.

Meanwhile, the outpost's first milk cow has arrived; her mate and calf died on the journey. She is left unattended at night just outside the house of the wealthiest English trader in town, the Chief Factor. Lu laments that poor men don't stand a chance to get ahead without some kind of fortune or committing a crime. Cookie reminisces about his days as a baker's assistant in Boston and tells Lu that he could use some of the cow's milk to make baked goods. They sneak onto the Chief Factor's property at night, Cookie milking the cow and Lu keeping watch from a tree. They manage to get enough milk to bake a batch of buttermilk biscuits. Cookie is unsatisfied with the result, wishing it could be sweeter, but Lu points out they are far better than anything on the outpost and suggests they could make a fortune. Cookie refines his recipe and adds honey.

They take their first batch of sweet oily cakes to market. When asked the recipe, Lu claims it's a "Chinese secret." The first few men to try them excitedly ask for more, and a bidding war erupts for the last cake. Word spreads and the men line up day after day as they run out. One day, a big man shoves a slight man aside for the last cake, and Lu does not object, only caring for the money. As they get richer, they decide it's safer to store their money in a tree than to take it to a bank.

The Chief Factor tries their cakes and asks Cookie to bake a clafoutis, the favorite of a captain he wants to impress at their next meeting. Lu and Cookie proudly deliver the clafoutis and observe as the Chief Factor offers tea with cream to the captain, remarking that despite his cow's good breeding, it is producing very little milk. He takes the captain, the chief, Cookie and Lu to see the cow, which recognizes Cookie and nuzzles him. Cookie urges Lu to leave town now, sensing the danger, but Lu persuades him they don't have enough to get to San Francisco and start their business, so they go back the next night to milk the cow once again.

A man at the Chief Factor's estate comes out to fetch a cat, and the tree branch breaks before Cookie hears Lu's warning call. They run as the alarm is raised, and after the captain sees the pail and stool and informs the Chief Factor his cow was being milked, they send their men to kill Lu and Cookie. When they reach a river, Lu jumps, but Cookie hides, then falls down a hill. Cookie wakes up in a shack, helped by an elderly Native American couple. He says he needs to find his friend and soon leaves.

Lu trades his buttons to hire a canoe to go downstream in search of Cookie, and returns to the shack, hiding from the Chief Factor's men rummaging through the destruction. He retrieves their money from the tree. Cookie returns to the shack, walking by the cow on the Factor's estate, now surrounded by a fence. He is spied by the slight man Lu ignored in line at the market, who follows with a rifle.

Cookie finds Lu at the shack, and Lu suggests they catch the next boat south. Cookie can't keep up through the woods and he lies down, clearly fatigued. Lu tells Cookie they will be safe and promises to keep watch, then lies beside him, reassures him, and closes his eyes.

Cast
 John Magaro as Otis "Cookie" Figowitz
 Orion Lee as King-Lu
 René Auberjonois as Man with Raven
 Toby Jones as Chief Factor
 Ewen Bremner as Lloyd
 Scott Shepherd as Captain
 Gary Farmer as Totillicum
 Lily Gladstone as Chief Factor's Wife
 Alia Shawkat as Woman with Dog
 Dylan Smith as Jack
 Stephen Malkmus as Fiddler
 Mitchell Saddleback as Chief Factor's Servant
 Jared Kasowski as Thomas
 Todd A. Robinson as Fort Trapper

Production
In October 2018, it was announced that Kelly Reichardt would direct the film, from a screenplay she wrote alongside Jonathan Raymond. Neil Kopp, Vincent Savino, Anish Savjani, Scott Rudin and Eli Bush would produce the film under their FilmScience and Scott Rudin Productions banners, respectively, while A24 would distribute.

In November 2018, René Auberjonois was cast in the film. In March 2019, it was announced that John Magaro had joined the cast.

Principal photography began in November 2018 in Oregon. The film was shot in a 4:3 aspect ratio.

Release
First Cow had its world premiere at the Telluride Film Festival on August 30, 2019. It screened at the New York Film Festival on September 28, 2019. Although it was released in four U.S. theaters on March 6, 2020, the film was pulled from release by A24 on March 15, due to the COVID-19 pandemic. It was released for purchase on VOD platforms on July 10, 2020, and became available to rent on July 21.

Critical reception 
The website's critical consensus reads, "First Cow finds director Kelly Reichardt revisiting territory and themes that will be familiar to fans of her previous work—with typically rewarding results." On Metacritic, the film has a weighted average score of 89 out of 100, based on 44 critics, indicating "universal acclaim".

A. A. Dowd and Katie Rife of The A.V. Club gave the film a positive review, praising its simplicity and precise storytelling.

At the end of 2020, 119 film critics included the film on their top-ten lists, with 18 ranking it first and 20 ranking it second.

Accolades

Notes

References

See also
Native Americans in film
Oregon Trail
Slow cinema

External links
 
 Script 
Official MUBI trailer

2019 films
American drama films
Films produced by Scott Rudin
Films directed by Kelly Reichardt
2019 independent films
Films set in Oregon
Films shot in Oregon
A24 (company) films
2019 drama films
Films set in 1820
Films about friendship
Films about race and ethnicity
Films about cattle
Films about immigration to the United States
Films set in the 1820s
2010s English-language films
2010s American films